The bantamweight was the second-lightest boxing weight class held as part of the Boxing at the 1904 Summer Olympics programme. The competition was held on September 22, 1904. It was the first time the event, like all other boxing events, was held in Olympic competition. Bantamweights had to weigh less than 52.2 kilograms. There were two entrants in this competition.

Results

References

Sources
 

Bantamweight